Şah Sultan ("sovereign";  1500 –  1572), also called Şahıhuban ("sovereign of the good"), Şahi or Devlet Şah Sultan ("sovereign of the reign"), was an Ottoman princess, daughter of Sultan Selim I, and half-sister of Suleiman the Magnificent. She was a prominent figure during her brother's reign.

Biography
The identity of her mother is unknown. Although some historian refer to her mother as Ayşe Hatun, Selim's secondary consort, the palace records never mention her mother's name and she is only referred to as "Mother of Şah Sultan".

She was raised in Manisa and married in 1523 to the future Grand Vizier and Sufic Lütfi Pasha.

Her spouse became Grand Vizier in 1539, she wielded a great power in Istanbul. The couple had at least a daughter named Esmehan Sultan.

In 1541, she divorced her spouse, who was also deposed from his position. The divorce took place on her initiative, allegedly because of her husband's punishment of a woman for adultery. Lütfi Pasha ordered the cutting of an extremity of an adultress and this led to a dispute between the Pasha and Şah Sultan. As the argument got heated, Lütfi Pasha gave Şah Sultan a beating. Following the incident, Şah Sultan got the Pasha beaten by her servants and complained to her brother, Sultan Suleiman, and requested a divorce. This led to the deposition of Lütfi Pasha from his position as the Grand Vizier of the Ottoman Empire. Perhaps she later remarried to Merkez Efendi.

She had the Şah Sultan Mosque built in 1556. Later, she built a school in Silivrikapı. She also dedicated her lands which were assigned to her by her brother Suleiman the Magnificent. She died in 1572 and was buried in her own turbe, inside Yavuz Selim Mosque.

Issue 
From her marriage to Lütfi, Şah certainly had a daughter:

 Esmehan Hanımsultan ( 1524 – 1556). She married Huseyn Pasha, she had two daughters, Neslihan Hanim (married) and Vasfihan Hanim (married with Küçük Ömer Ağa, she had a son, Ahmed Bey)

According to some sources, she was also the mother of:
 Sultanzade Ahmed Bey
 Sultanzade Abdi Bey
 Sultanzade Mahmud Bey

Depictions in literature and popular culture
In the TV series Muhteşem Yüzyıl, Şah Sultan is played by Turkish actress Deniz Çakır. In this adaptation, she is presented as Hafsa Sultan's daughter and Suleiman's full sister, rather than his half-sister.

See also 

Ottoman Empire
Ottoman dynasty
Ottoman family tree
Ottoman Emperors family tree (simplified)

References

Sources

 Peirce, Leslie P., The Imperial Harem: Women and Sovereignty in the Ottoman Empire, Oxford University Press, 1993,  (paperback).

1509 births
1572 deaths
16th-century Ottoman princesses